Spider Lake is the name of several places:
Spider Lake (California)
Spider Lake (Gogebic County, Michigan)
Spider Lake (Grand Traverse County, Michigan)
Spider Lake (Minnesota)
Spider Lake, Wisconsin
Spider Lake Provincial Park, British Columbia, Canada
Spider Lake (Vancouver Island)